Jenny Levy is the University of North Carolina women's lacrosse head coach and a 2021 inductee into the National Lacrosse Hall of Fame. She is the only head coach in the history of the University of North Carolina women's lacrosse program, and, as of 2021, was in her 26th season as the head coach. She has led the team to three national championships and has twice been named the National Coach of the Year. She was also named as the head coach of the United States women's national lacrosse team in November 2017.

Levy played lacrosse at the University of Virginia from 1988-1992 and was a member of the United States women's national lacrosse team in 1992-1993, and then again in 1995. She was named as a first-team All American and as the 1992 NCAA Attacker of the Year. She was named as one of the top 50 players in ACC history in 2002.

From 1993-1994 she was the assistant women's lacrosse coach at Georgetown University. In October 1994, she became the University of North Carolina first women's lacrosse coach.

References 

American lacrosse players
College lacrosse coaches in the United States
Living people
Year of birth missing (living people)